Inside the Exorcist is a horror and film history podcast about The Exorcist created by Mark Ramsey and produced by Wondery.

Background 
The podcast contains seven episodes. The podcast was researched, written, and narrated by Mark Ramsey and Linda Blair and sound design by Jeff Schmidt. The podcast contains both fiction and nonfiction elements.

Reception 
Bryan Bishop wrote in The Verge that the show "is flat-out the scariest podcast that I've ever heard." Chelsea Tatham wrote in the Tampa Bay Times that the podcast "presents a chilling dive into the film's past". Alison Nastasi wrote in Flavorwire Magazine that the show is "drenched in demonic atmosphere". Juliana Colant wrote in The Post that the podcast is the "perfect binge-worthy series."

See also 
 List of horror podcasts
 List of film and television podcasts

References

External links 

Audio podcasts
2017 podcast debuts
2017 podcast endings
Horror podcasts
Documentary podcasts
Scripted podcasts
Film and television podcasts
History podcasts
American podcasts